Thomas W. Enright (born 26 July 1940) is a former Irish Fine Gael politician who served as a Teachta Dála (TD) for the Laois–Offaly constituency from 1969 to 1992 and 1997 to 2002. He also served as a Senator for the Administrative Panel from 1992 to 1997.

Early life and education
Enright was born in Shinrone, County Offaly, in 1940. He was educated at the Cistercian College, Roscrea, University College Dublin and the Incorporated Law Society of Ireland.

Political career
He practised as a solicitor before becoming involved in politics in 1967 as a member of Offaly County Council for the Birr local electoral area. Enright was first elected to Dáil Éireann as a Fine Gael TD for the Laois–Offaly constituency at the 1969 general election. He was subsequently appointed Fine Gael spokesperson on Tourism (1977–1979) and Consumer Affairs (1979–1981).

Enright lost his Dáil seat at the 1992 general election to Pat Gallagher as part of the swing to the Labour Party in that election. He was then elected to the 20th Seanad, where he served from 1993 to 1997. He regained his Dáil seat at the 1997 general election and retired at the 2002 general election. He was succeeded by his daughter Olwyn Enright.

See also
Families in the Oireachtas

References

1940 births
Living people
Fine Gael TDs
Local councillors in County Offaly
Members of the 20th Seanad
Members of the 19th Dáil
Members of the 20th Dáil
Members of the 21st Dáil
Members of the 22nd Dáil
Members of the 23rd Dáil
Members of the 24th Dáil
Members of the 25th Dáil
Members of the 26th Dáil
Members of the 28th Dáil
Politicians from County Offaly
People educated at Cistercian College, Roscrea
Alumni of University College Dublin
Fine Gael senators